Andrew Bruce' (born December 7, 1958 on Trinidad) is a retired athlete from Trinidad and Tobago who specialized in the 200 metres. He represented Trinidad at the 1980 Moscow Olympics in the 200 metres, where he reached the semifinals. Andrew Bruce, who ran the 220 leg on U of M's world record setting sprint medley relay team in 1979, represented Trinidad and Tobago in the 200 meters sprint and 4x100 meter relay. He won his first heat in the 200 in a time of :21.35 and placed fourth in the second round at :20.9 He anchored the 400 meter relay team to a 5th-place finish, just .03 seconds behind Jamaica and a spot in the finals. Bruce returned to school to capture Big Ten titles in the 60 and 300 yard dash (indoor) and the 100 and 200 meter dash (outdoor) in 1981 and 1982

Andrew Bruce was inducted into the University of Michigan Track and Field Hall of Fame.

Andrew Bruce from Trinidad and Tobago specialized in the 200-meter dash for the U-M track and field team 1979-1982. He represented Trinidad at the 1980 Moscow Olympics in the 200-meter, reaching the semifinals.

At Michigan, Bruce captured eight Big Ten titles in four events: the 60- and 300-yard dashes (indoor) and the 100- and 200-meter dashes (outdoor) in 1981 and 1982. Bruce ran the 220-meter leg on U-M's world record setting sprint medley relay team in 1979 and represented Trinidad and Tobago in the 200-meter sprint and 4x100 meter relay. He won his first heat in the 200m with a time of 21.35 and placed fourth in the second round at 20.9. He anchored the 400-meter relay team to a fifth-place finish—just .03 seconds behind Jamaica to earn a spot in the finals.

http://www.socawarriors.net/forum/index.php?topic=35771.0

Achievements

References

External links
Best of Trinidad
 http://www.mgoblue.com/track-field-m/article.aspx?1d=136988
 https://bentley.umich.edu/athdept/olymp2/ol1980.htm

1958 births
Living people
Trinidad and Tobago male sprinters
Athletes (track and field) at the 1980 Summer Olympics
Olympic athletes of Trinidad and Tobago
Athletes (track and field) at the 1983 Pan American Games
Pan American Games competitors for Trinidad and Tobago
Michigan Wolverines men's track and field athletes
Central American and Caribbean Games bronze medalists for Trinidad and Tobago
Competitors at the 1982 Central American and Caribbean Games
Central American and Caribbean Games medalists in athletics